Arabs in Turkey refers to the 1.5-2 million citizens and residents of Turkey who are ethnically of Arab descent. They are the third-largest minority in the country after the Kurds and the Circassians and are concentrated in a few provinces in Southeastern Anatolia. Since the beginning of the Syrian civil war in 2011, millions of Arab Syrian refugees have sought refuge in Turkey.

Background 
Besides the large communities of both foreign and Turkish Arabs in Istanbul and other large cities, most live in the south and southeast.

Turkish Arabs are mostly Muslims living along the southeastern border with Syria and Iraq but also in Mediterranean coastal regions in the following provinces: Batman, Bitlis, Gaziantep, Hatay, Mardin, Muş, Siirt, Şırnak, Şanlıurfa, Mersin and Adana. Many Bedouin tribes, in addition to other Arabs who settled there, arrived before Turkic tribes came to Anatolia from Central Asia in the 11th century. Many of these Arabs have ties to Arabs in Syria and Saudi Arabia, especially in the city of Raqqa. Arab society in Turkey has been subject to Turkification, yet some speak Arabic in addition to Turkish. The Treaty of Lausanne ceded to Turkey large areas that had been part of Ottoman Syria, especially in Aleppo Vilayet.

Besides a significant Shafi'i Sunni population, about 300,000 to 350,000 are Alawites (distinct from Alevism). About 18,000 Arab Christians belong mostly to the Greek Orthodox Church of Antioch. There are also few Arab Jews in Hatay and other Turkish parts of the former Aleppo Vilayet, but this community has shrank considerably since the late 1940s, mostly due to migration to Israel and other parts of Turkey.

History

Pre-Islamic period 

Arabs presence in what used to be called Asia Minor, dates back to the Hellenistic period. The Arab dynasty of the Abgarids were rulers of the Kingdom of Osroene, with its capital in the ancient city of Edessa (Modern day city of Urfa). According to Retsö, The Arabs presence in Edessa dates back to AD 49. In addition, the Roman author Pliny the Elder refers to the natives of Osroene as Arabs and the region as Arabia. In the nearby Tektek Mountains, Arabs seem to have made it the seat of the governors of 'Arab. An early Arab figure who flourished in Anatolia is the 2nd century grammarian Phrynichus Arabius, specifically in the Roman province of Bithynia. Another example, is the 4th century Roman politician Domitius Modestus who was appointed by Emperor Julian to the position of Praefectus urbi of Constantinople (Modern day Istanbul). And under Emperor Valens, he became Praetorian Prefect of the East whose seat was also in Constantinople. In the 6th century, The famous Arab poet Imru' al-Qais journeyed to Constantinople in the time of Byzantine Emperor Justinian I. On his way back, it is said that he died and was buried at Ancyra (Modern day Ankara) in the Central Anatolia Region.

The age of Islam 
In the early Islamic conquests, the Rashidun Caliphate successful campaigns in the Levant lead to the fall of the Ghassanids. The last Ghassanid king Jabalah ibn al-Aiham with as many as 30,000 Arab followers managed to avoid the punishment of the Caliph Umar by escaping to the domains of the Byzantine Empire. King Jabalah ibn al-Aiham established a government-in-exile in Constantinople and lived in Anatolia until his death in 645. Following the early Muslim conquests, Asia Minor became the main ground for the Arab-Byzantine wars. Among those Arabs who were killed in the wars was Abu Ayyub al-Ansari, a companion of the Islamic prophet Muhammad. Abu Ayyub was buried at the walls of Constantinople. Centuries later, after the Ottomans conquest of the city, a tomb above Abu Ayyub's grave was constructed and a mosque built by the name of Eyüp Sultan Mosque. From that point on, the area became known as the locality of Eyup by the Ottoman officials. Another instance of Arab presence in what is nowadays Turkey, is the settlement of Arab tribes in the 7th century in the region of Al-Jazira (Upper Mesopotamia), that partially encompasses Southeastern Turkey. Among those tribes are the Banu Bakr, Mudar, Rabi'ah ibn Nizar and Banu Taghlib.

Demographics 

According to a Turkish study based on a large survey in 2006, 0.7% of the total population in Turkey were ethnically Arab. The population of Arabs in Turkey varies according to different sources. A 1995 American estimate put the numbers between 800,000 and 1 million. According to Ethnologue, in 1992 there were 500,000 people with Arabic as their mother tongue in Turkey. Another Turkish study estimated the Arab population to be between 1.1 and 2.4%.

In a 2020 interview with Al Jazeera, the prominent Turco-Arab politician Yasin Aktay estimated the number of Arabs in Turkey at nine million (or 10% of Turkey's population), half of them from other countries.

Notable people
Emine Erdoğan, wife of President Recep Tayyip Erdoğan, whose family is from Siirt.
Yasin Aktay, aide to President Erdoğan.
Hüseyin Çelik, politician (Arab father).
Murat Yıldırım, actor, (Arab mother).
Murathan Mungan, author, (Arab father).
Nicholas Kadi, actor of (Iraqi descent).
Mihrac Ural, militant and leader of the Syrian Resistance. 
Selin Sayek Böke, politician.
Sertab Erener, singer, songwriter and composer.
Pınar Deniz, actress.
Selin Şekerci, actress (Arab father).
İbrahim Tatlıses, actor and singer, (Arab father).
Nur Yerlitaş, fashion designer, (Arab mother).
Ahmet Düverioğlu, basketball player.
Mert Fırat, actor and screenwriter.
Jehan Barbur, singer and songwriter.
Atiye, pop singer of Arab descent.
Selami Şahin, singer and songwriter.
Selçuk İnan, football player.
 Kerim Frei, football player (Arab Mother).
 Muhaymin Mustafa
 Murat Salar, football player

See also
 Turks in the Arab world
 Alawites in Turkey
 Hatay Province
 Arab diaspora
 Iraqis in Turkey
 Syrians in Turkey
 Refugees of the Syrian Civil War in Turkey

References

Further reading
 

Arab diaspora in Europe
Arab diaspora in Asia
Arab world articles needing expert attention
Cultural assimilation
Demographics of Turkey
Ethnic groups in Turkey
Turkish Arab people
Ethnic groups in the Middle East
Arab diaspora